Isadora Lopes de Souza (born 3 August 1997) is a Brazilian rugby sevens player. She represented Brazil at the 2022 Rugby World Cup Sevens in Cape Town. They defeated Spain 19–17 in the 11th-place final to finish eleventh overall.

References

1997 births
Living people
Female rugby sevens players
Brazilian rugby sevens players
Brazil international women's rugby sevens players